Piper Dellums is an  American author and public speaker. She is the daughter of former U.S. Congressman and Oakland Mayor Ron Dellums.

Personal life 
Her story about a white South African girl coming to live with her family in the 1970s, titled "Simunye", was the basis for the Disney movie The Color of Friendship (2000). The film won an Emmy Award. In The Color of Friendship, the role of Piper Dellums was played by Shadia Simmons. She is the daughter of Ron Dellums. Her brother Erik is an actor and voice actor.

Piper travels throughout America, speaking at conferences and workshops about her personal struggles.

References

Place of birth missing (living people)
Year of birth missing (living people)
African-American women writers
American women writers
African-American writers
Living people
Dellums family
21st-century African-American people
21st-century African-American women